Natalie Martinez is an American actress and model. She appeared in the 2008 film Death Race, several music videos between 2003 and 2011, and two short-lived telenovelas in 2006 and 2007. Martinez starred in the single season of the crime drama Detroit 1-8-7, had a recurring role for one season of CSI: NY, starred in one season of the drama series Kingdom, and appeared in the 2019 science fiction miniseries The I-Land. In 2021, Martinez began starring in the NBC drama series  Ordinary Joe.

Early life and education
Martinez was born in 1984 in Miami, Florida, and is of full Cuban ancestry. She graduated from St. Brendan High School in 2002.

Career
Martinez appeared as the character Michelle Miller on the telenovela Fashion House (2006), which was cancelled after three months,  and she was cast as a major character in the 2007 series Chuck, appearing in first-season promotional pictures, but the showrunner decided to cut her character before the pilot was aired. Martinez then had a role in the 2008 film Death Race.

Martinez had starring roles in a number of other single-season television series, including Detroit 1-8-7, APB, and The Crossing. IN 2012, she starred in the first season of Under the Dome, and appeared in the season two premiere. She co-starred in one season of Secrets and Lies, and played the recurring role of Detective Jamie Lovato for one season in the crime drama CSI: NY.

Martinez' other film appearances include End of Watch (2012), Broken City (2013) and Self/less (2015).

In September 2018, it was announced that Martinez would appear in the main role of Chase on the Netflix science fiction miniseries The I-Land. The miniseries was released on September 12, 2019.

Filmography

Film

Television

Music videos
 Self Scientific – "Live & Breathe"
 Justin Timberlake – "Señorita"
 Sean Paul – "We Be Burnin'"
 Amr Diab – "Ne'ool Eih" 2007
 Wisin & Yandel – "Yo Te Quiero"
 Pitbull – "Rain Over Me" feat. Marc Anthony

References

External links

 
 
 

21st-century American actresses
Actresses from Miami
American entertainers of Cuban descent
American female models
American film actresses
American television actresses
Hispanic and Latino American actresses
Living people
Year of birth missing (living people)